State & Main may refer to:

State & Main, a Canadian restaurant chain owned by Franworks Group
State and Main, a 2000 film